Govindganj Assembly constituency is an assembly constituency in Purvi Champaran district in the Indian state of Bihar.

Overview
As per orders of Delimitation of Parliamentary and Assembly constituencies Order, 2008, 14. Govindganj Assembly constituency is composed of the following: Areraj and Paharpur community development blocks; and Paschimi Sangrampur, Purbi Sangrampur and Dakshani Bariyaria of Sangrampur CD Block.

Govindganj Assembly constituency is part of 3. Purvi Champaran (Lok Sabha constituency). It was earlier part of Motihari (Lok Sabha constituency).

Members of Legislative Assembly

Election results

2020

References

External links
 

Assembly constituencies of Bihar
Politics of East Champaran district